The Wales national amateur football team was the amateur representative team for Wales at football. It was formed in 1908 and continued until 1974.

History 
The Wales amateur national team played the majority of its fixtures versus the amateur representative teams of the other four Home Nations – England, Scotland, Northern Ireland and the Republic of Ireland. It had a losing record against each nation and won the British Amateur Championship on two occasions (one joint), in the 1967–68 and 1973–74 seasons. The team fared better in its matches against overseas opposition, winning its three matches versus Norwegian and South African representative teams, but losing on both occasions to the Netherlands. The squad was predominantly composed of players from Welsh non-league clubs Lovell's Athletic, Cardiff Corinthians, Bridgend Town, Bangor City, Llanelli and Porthmadog.

The team's first fixture was a friendly match played versus England at Edgeley Park on 22 February 1908, with England's Vivian Woodward scoring the only goal of the game. Thereafter the entirety of the team's fixtures took place against England until a friendly match versus South Africa in October 1924. The team failed to register its first win until 22 January 1921, when the Welsh beat England 2–0 at Molineux. The team was disbanded in 1974, when the FA abolished the distinction between amateurism and professionalism in domestic football.

Venues 
The team predominantly played its home matches at Farrar Road Stadium (Bangor), Vetch Field (Swansea) and Smithfield Athletic Ground (Aberystwyth).

Records

Most appearances

Most goals

Honours 

 British Amateur Championship winners: 1967–68 (shared on one occasion)

References 

Amateur
European national amateur association football teams
Former national association football teams in Europe
Organizations disestablished in 1974
Amateur sport in the United Kingdom